Skerries Harps is a Gaelic Athletic Association club based in Skerries, County Dublin, Ireland, playing Gaelic football, hurling and camogie. The club is located on the Dublin Road in Skerries with a main pitch and club house at this location. The club has just under 40 teams competing at all levels in football, hurling, camogie and ladies football. The club plays at senior level in football and camogie, intermediate level in ladies football and junior hurling. Current president is John Clinton and the club Chairman is Niall Murphy.

Notable players

Senior inter-county footballers
 Dublin 
 Bobby Beggs
 Bryan Cullen
 Harry Dawson

 Westmeath 
 Jack Smith

Senior inter-county ladies' footballers
  
 Lyndsey Davey

Senior inter-county camogie players
 Dublin 
 Jean Murphy

Honours
 1942 Dublin Junior Football Championship
 1947 Fingal League
 1950 Jubilee Cup
 1949/51 Rowan, Fingal, Feis McArdle Priests Cup
 Feis Fingal Cup - McArdle Cup
 1953 Dublin Junior Football Championship
 1954 Dublin Intermediate Football Championship
 1955 McArdle & Feis Fingal Cups
 1963 Semi-Finalists, Dublin Senior Football Championship
 Donaghmore Junior Tournament
 1964 Donaghmore Junior Tournament
 1980/1 Dublin Intermediate Football League
 1984 Fingal Intermediate Football League
 1985 Junior Fingal Football League
 1986 Junior Cup (Kennedy Cup)
 1993 Nugent Cup
 1998 Murphy Cup
 1989 Dublin Minor A Football Championship Winners
 2003 Dublin Minor B Football Championship: Winners
 2003 Dublin Under 21 B Football Championship: Winners
 2007 Dublin Junior E Hurling Championship Champions.
 2008 Dublin Intermediate Football Play-Off Winners
 2009 Junior Cup (Parson Cup)
 2009 Dublin AFL Div. 7 Winner
 2009 Dublin Minor D Football Championship: Winners
 2009 Dublin Camogie Senior B Championship Winners
 2011 Dublin Intermediate Football Championship Winners
 2014 Dublin Under 21 B Football Championship: Winners
 2015 Dublin Minor C Camogie Championship Champions
 2015 Dublin Minor Camogie Division 3 League Winners
 2016 Dublin AFL Division 2: Winners
 2016 Dublin AFL Div. 10 Winner 
 2017 Dublin Football Under 14 Division 1 féile Winners
 2021 Dublin Camogie Under 16 League Division 3 Winners
 2022 Dublin Camogie Under 15 Division 5 féile  Winners & National féile runners up
 2022 Dublin Camogie Under 16 League Division 4  Winners
 2022 Dublin Camogie Under 18 Shield Division 3  Winners

References

External links
Official Skerries Harps Website
Official Dublin GAA Website

Gaelic games clubs in Fingal
Gaelic football clubs in Fingal
Hurling clubs in Fingal
1908 establishments in Ireland